Jason James Doering (born April 22, 1978) is a former American football defensive back in the National Football League for the Indianapolis Colts and Washington Redskins.  He played college football at the University of Wisconsin and was drafted in the sixth round of the 2001 NFL Draft.

Reference

1978 births
Living people
People from Rhinelander, Wisconsin
Players of American football from Wisconsin
American football defensive backs
Wisconsin Badgers football players
Indianapolis Colts players
Washington Redskins players